The Mexican beauty pageant Nuestra Belleza Nuevo León 2005, was held at Las Lomas Eventos in Monterrey, Nuevo León, on July 11, 2005. Eight contestants competed for the title.

At the end of the final night of competition Priscila Perales of San Pedro Garza García was crowned the winner. Elizondo was crowned by the outgoing titleholder, Ana Paola de la Parra.

Results

Placements

Special awards

Judges
Luz Elena González - Nuestra Belleza Jalisco 1994 and actress
Arturo Carmona - actor
Cecy Gutiérrez - TV hostess
Silvia Salgado - Nuestra Belleza México 1998
Ana Laura Corral - national co-ordinator of Nuestra Belleza México

Background music
Reik - "Qué vida la mía" and "Yo quisiera"

Contestants

References

External links
Official website

Nuestra Belleza México